Józef Bełch  (4 July 1909 in Różanka - 10 September 1993 in Korczyna) was a Polish painter.

20th-century Polish painters
20th-century Polish male artists
1909 births
1993 deaths
Polish male painters